Glasgow High School may refer to any of several schools.

High School of Glasgow, an independent school in Glasgow, and the oldest school in Scotland
Glasgow High School (Delaware) in Newark, Delaware
Glasgow High School (Kentucky) in Glasgow, Kentucky